In mathematical logic, category theory, and
computer science, kappa calculus is a
formal system for defining first-order
functions.

Unlike lambda calculus, kappa calculus has no
higher-order functions; its functions are
not first class objects.  Kappa-calculus can be
regarded as "a reformulation of the first-order fragment of typed
lambda calculus".

Because its functions are not first-class objects, evaluation of kappa
calculus expressions does not require
closures.

Definition 

The definition below has been adapted from the diagrams on pages 205 and 207 of Hasegawa.

Grammar 

Kappa calculus consists of types and expressions, given by the
grammar below:

In other words,

 1 is a type
 Every variable is an expression
 If  is a type then  is an expression
 If  is a type then  is an expression
 If  is a type and e is an expression then  is an expression
 If x is a variable,  is a type, and e is an expression, then  is an expression

sometimes omitted when they can be unambiguously determined from the
context.

Juxtaposition is often used as an abbreviation for a combination of
 and composition:

Typing rules 

The presentation here uses sequents rather than hypothetical judgments in order to ease comparison with the simply typed lambda calculus.  This requires the additional Var rule, which does not appear in Hasegawa

In kappa calculus an expression has two types: the type of its source and the type of its target.  The notation  is used to indicate that expression e has source type  and target type .

Expressions in kappa calculus are assigned types according to the following rules:

{| cellpadding="9" style="text-align:center;"
| || (Var)
|-
| || (Id)
|-
| || (Bang)
|-
| || (Comp)
|-
|
| (Lift)
|-
|
|(Kappa)
|}

In other words,

 Var: assuming  lets you conclude that 
 Id: for any type , 
 Bang: for any type , 
 Lift: if , then 
 Kappa: if we can conclude that  under the assumption that , then we may conclude without that assumption that

Equalities 

Kappa calculus obeys the following equalities:

 Neutrality: If  then  and 
 Terminality: If  and  then 
 Lift-Reduction: 
 Kappa-Reduction:  if x is not free in h

The last two equalities are reduction rules for the calculus,
rewriting from left to right.

Properties 

The type  can be regarded as the unit type.  Because of this, any two functions whose argument type is the same and whose result type is  should be equal – since there is only a single value of type  both functions must return that value for every argument (Terminality).

Expressions with type  can be regarded as "constants" or values of "ground type"; this is because  is the unit type, and so a function from this type is necessarily a constant function. This is the basic mechanism which ensures that all functions are first-order.

Categorical semantics 

Kappa calculus is intended to be the internal language of
contextually complete categories.

Examples 

Expressions with multiple arguments have source types which are
"right-imbalanced" binary trees.  For example, a function f with three
arguments of types A, B, and C and result type D will have type

 

If we define left-associative juxtaposition  as an abbreviation
 – we can apply this function:

 

Since the expression  has source type , it is a "ground value" and may be passed as an argument to another function. If , then

 

Much like a curried function of type
 in lambda calculus, partial
application is possible:

 

However no higher types (i.e. ) are involved.

 

Because successive application is used for multiple
arguments it is not necessary to know the arity of a function in
order to determine its typing; for example, if we know that
 then the expression

 

is well-typed as long as  has type
  for some 
This property is important when calculating
the principal type of an expression, something
which can be difficult when attempting to exclude higher-order
functions from typed lambda calculi by restricting the grammar of types.

History 

Barendregt originally introduced the term
"functional completeness" in the context of combinatory algebra.
Kappa calculus arose out of efforts by Lambek<ref
name="Lambek"/> to formulate an appropriate analogue of functional
completeness for arbitrary categories (see Hermida and Jacobs,<ref
name=HermidaJacobs/> section 1).  Hasegawa later developed kappa
calculus into a usable (though simple) programming language including
arithmetic over natural numbers and primitive recursion.<ref
name="Hasegawa"/>  Connections to arrows
were later investigated by Power, Thielecke, and others.

Variants 

It is possible to explore versions of kappa calculus with
substructural types such as linear, affine,
and ordered types.  These extensions require eliminating or
restricting the  expression.  In such circumstances
the  type operator is not a true cartesian product,
and is generally written  to make this clear.

References 

Logical calculi